"Where Are You, Dear General?" is a North Korean song, supposedly written by Kim Jong-il. Since at least 2008, the song plays through speakers of Pyongyang Railway Station in the morning.

History 
The song was composed as the theme for the 1971 revolutionary opera A True Daughter of the Party. The song's alleged composer is the former Supreme Leader of North Korea Kim Jong-il. A True Daughter of the Party is set during the Korean War and features the army nurse Kang Yeon-ok as the protagonist. "Where Are You, Dear General?" is performed towards the opera's climax as Kang delivers military intelligence to North Korean headquarters. In the song, Kang expresses her lifelong dream to meet her great leader and "dear general" Kim Il-sung. The pro-North Korean propaganda site DPRK Today describes the song as an "immortal classic masterpiece". The song became regularly performed by official choirs and it is broadcast on North Korean television.

Current use 
A cover of the song by the Pochonbo Electronic Ensemble plays every morning in the North Korean capital of Pyongyang at 6a.m. through a system of loudspeakers on the clock tower of the cities' railway station. Tourists visiting Pyongyang have reported this daily occurrence since 2008. It has been assumed that the city-wide broadcast of the song serves as a morning alarm clock. The writer Travis Jeppesen, in his 2018 book See You Again in Pyongyang about his travels in North Korea, described the sound of "Where Are You, Dear General?" through Pyongyang's loudspeakers as that of an "antiquated synthesizer" such as a theremin. Others have described the sound as "heavily distorted and barely recognizable" from the original song.

See also 
 Music of North Korea
 North Korean cult of personality

References 

North Korean propaganda songs
Propaganda songs
Propaganda in North Korea
Patriotic songs
1971 songs
Songs about Kim Il-sung
Opera excerpts